John George Painter (September 20, 1888 – March 1, 2001) was an American supercentenarian who was posthumously recognized as the world's oldest man and oldest American veteran. He was born on September 20, 1888, on a farm in Jackson County, Tennessee. As a child, he attended school and worked on the farm. Longevity ran in Painter's family; his father lived to 99, and his siblings lived to ages between 87 and 105.

In 1917, at age 29, he enlisted in the United States Army. As a part of Battery D in the 115th Artillery Battalion, he hauled ammunition and artillery supplies, including field guns, transporting all the supplies on horses or mules. Painter saw action at the Meuse-Argonne Offensive. Eighty days after the armistice was declared on November 11, 1918, Painter received the highest French honor, the Légion d'honneur award. He also received the Croix de Guerre and was one of only six Tennessee World War I veterans to be awarded the Tennessee Distinguished Award. Painter had to leave his son, Sean Humphrey Painter, when he went to war. He was discharged from service on April 12, 1919, after serving in the army for two years.

After his discharge, Painter pursued a career as a blacksmith and married his childhood sweetheart, Gillie Watson. The couple adopted two daughters. On November 19, 1999, Painter was recognized as the world's oldest veteran at age 111. On September 20, 2000, Tennessee Representative Bart Gordon read a proclamation in honor of John's 112th birthday.

See also
 List of the verified oldest people
 List of the oldest living men since 1973

References

1888 births
2001 deaths
United States Army personnel of World War I
American supercentenarians
Recipients of the Legion of Honour
Men supercentenarians
People from Jackson County, Tennessee
Recipients of the Croix de Guerre 1914–1918 (France)
United States Army soldiers
Military personnel from Tennessee